Phillipa Mary Towler-Green (born 11 May 1984 in Lambeth, London) is a former competitive English ice dancer.

Career 
Initially a singles and pair skater, Towler-Green took up ice dancing at age ten. With Robert Burgerman, she won two junior international medals, silver at the Pavel Roman Memorial and silver at the Mezzaluna Trophy in Rome. They represented Great Britain at four JGPs and one World Junior Championship and were crowned British junior ice dance champions 2000.

In 2003, Towler-Green teamed up with Phillip Poole. They won the silver medal at the British Ice Figure and Dance Championships for four consecutive years from the (2005–06) season to (2008–09) season and represented Great Britain at the 2006, 2007 and 2008 European Championships as well as the 2009 World Championships held in Los Angeles. They won two international medals: in Oberstdorf (3rd) and at the Ondrei Nepala Memorial in Bratislava (2nd). As of 2010, the couple no longer skate together.

Poole and Towler-Green have also been part of the BBC New Year Eve show at Somerset House and have opened many of the open air London ice rinks (Tiffany and Co opening Somerset House, the Natural History Museum, Hampton Court Palace for Heart radio etc..) For 3 years running they opened Winter Wonderland in Edinburgh, and also Southampton and Winchester ice rinks for Cousins entertainment. They also took part in the Dancing on Ice DFS adverts and skated in Inspiration on Ice for Cancer Research alongside Nicky Slater. Towler-Green also appears in the Nokia N8 advert.

Phillipa worked for ITVs Dancing on Ice during the 2011–12 season as reserve pro skater. She coached Chico who went on to finish 3rd in the show. Phillipa also worked on the Dancing on Ice goes Gold Olympic special working with Colin Jackson, Tessa Sanderson and Jamie Baulch. Phillipa then went on to be full time coach for the 2018 come back show Dancing on Ice.

Towler-Green was also part of the London Olympic Closing Ceremony 2012. She was part of the Eric Idol number as a roller skating Nun

Towler-Green now coaches with her Mum Diane Towler-Green MBE and her twin sister Candice in south London.

Personal life 
Towler-Green is the daughter of former World Champion ice dancer Diane Towler, who was also her coach and the twin sister of ice dancer Candice Towler-Green, British Junior Champion 2001–02. She teaches at Streatham ice rink in London. Her godfather is Courtney Jones OBE who won World Ice Dance title with both Doreen Denny and later June Markham, and who is a member of the World Figure skating Hall of Fame and currently is an ISU Council member.

Results
(with Poole)

References

External links

 
 Phillipa Towler-Green & Phillip Poole – Official website

1984 births
English female ice dancers
Living people
Sportspeople from London